Home Park can be

Places

 Home Park (Atlanta), a neighborhood of Atlanta
 Home Park, Windsor, an area of parkland associated with Windsor Castle
 Hampton Court Park, London, also known as Home Park
 Horn Park, Royal Borough of Greenwich, also historically known as Home Park

Sports
 Home Park, an association football stadium located in Plymouth, England, home to Plymouth Argyle F.C.